Evensk is an urban-type settlement in the Severo-Evensky District, Magadan Oblast, Russia. , it has a population of 1567.

Geography
The village is located by the seashore in Gizhigin Bay of the Sea of Okhotsk.

Climate
Evensk has a cold subarctic climate (Köppen climate classification Dfc), with very cold, snowy winters and rather cool, short summers. Precipitation is quite high compared to interior Siberia, and somewhat higher in summer than at other times of the year. Climate data was taken from nearby settlement of Nayakhan.

See also
Severo-Evensk Airport

References

Urban-type settlements in Magadan Oblast